Five ships of the British Royal Navy have been named HMS Black Prince, after Edward, the Black Prince (1330–1376), the eldest son of King Edward III of England.

 The first Black Prince was a 10-gun vessel purchased by the Royalists in March 1650, and burnt by Parliamentarians on 4 November of the same year.
 The second  was a 74-gun third rate launched in 1816, in use as a prison ship after 1848, and broken up 1855.
 The third , launched in 1861, was the second  battleship.  Retired to the reserve fleet in 1878; became a training ship in 1896; renamed Emerald in 1903; renamed Impregnable III in 1910; scrapped in 1923.
 The fourth , launched in 1904, was a  sunk with all hands during the Battle of Jutland in 1916.
She was decommissioned in 1962 and scrapped.

Battle honours
Ships named Black Prince have earned the following battle honours:
Jutland, 1916
Arctic, 1944
Normandy, 1944
English Channel, 1944
Aegean, 1944
South France, 1944
Okinawa, 1945

Royal Navy ship names
Edward the Black Prince